Future Sound of Melbourne (also known as FSOM) is an Australian electronic group formed in Melbourne in 1990. 
At the ARIA Music Awards of 1996, they won the award for ARIA Award for Best Dance Release for their album, Chapter One.

Career
Future Sound of Melbourne were an Australian electronic music trio formed in 1990 by bass and drum producer, Davide Carbone, bass guitarist and vocalist, Josh Abrahams, and acid house DJ, Steve Robbins.

In October 1995, the group released Chapter One. At the ARIA Music Awards of 1996, the album won the ARIA Award for Best Dance Release.

Abrahams left the group in 1995 to start his solo career, later performing as Puretone. Carbone relocated to the United Kingdom in 1998 where he established a record label, BS1 Records. Carbone and Robbins performed as FSOM at the  Roskilde Festival in Denmark in 1999.

Discography

Studio albums

Compilation albums

Extended plays

Singles

Awards

ARIA Music Awards
The ARIA Music Awards is an annual awards ceremony that recognises excellence, innovation, and achievement across all genres of Australian music. They commenced in 1987. Future Sound of Melbourne won one award.

|-
| 1996
| Chapter One
| ARIA Award for Best Dance Release
| 
|-

References

ARIA Award winners
Australian dance music groups
Australian house music groups
Australian electronic music groups
Australian techno groups
Australian musical duos
Musicians from Melbourne